Succinea, common name the amber snails, is a large genus of small, air-breathing land snails, terrestrial pulmonate gastropod molluscs in the family Succineidae. 

The common name refers to the fact that live snails in this genus are translucent and similar to amber in appearance.

Description
The length of the shell ranges between 9.4 mm and 17 mm, the width between 6.8 mm and 11.5 mm.

The dextrous, pointed ovoid shell consists of  3⅓ - 3½ whorls. It is thin-walled, glossy and translucent. The protoconch is very compact. The spire is short and consists mainly of a large, wide body whorl and an oval aperture with a sharp angle at the top. The deep sutures are prominent.The interior surface of the aperture is cream-colored or white.

The shell is usually light brown, but may be whitish with gray or light yellow streaks.

The large body cannot be completely withdrawn within the shell. The lower pair of tentacles is vestigial.

The many species in this genus are difficult to distinguish. Sometimes they need dissecting to confirm identification through the shape of the jaw and character of the reproductive system.

Distribution
This large genus has a worldwide distribution. Species in this genus usually live in damp habitats such as marshes. Some species are amphibious.

Species
Species within the genus Succinea include:

 Succinea aegyptiaca Ehrenberg, 1831
 Succinea aequinoctialis d'Orbigny, 1837
 Succinea africana F. Krauss, 1848
 Succinea alpestris Möllendorff, 1875
 Succinea amoi C. M. Cooke & Clench, 1945
 Succinea ampulacea E. von Martens, 1898
 Succinea andecola Crawford, 1939
 Succinea angustior (C. B. Adams, 1850)
 † Succinea antiqua Colbeau, 1867
 Succinea aperta I. Lea, 1838
 Succinea apicalis Ancey, 1904
 Succinea approximans Shuttleworth, 1854
 Succinea approximata G. B. Sowerby II, 1872
 Succinea arangoi Pfeiffer, 1866 (taxon inquirendum)
 Succinea arboricola Connolly, 1912
 Succinea archeyi Powell, 1933
 Succinea argentina Miquel, Rapacioli & Meneghini, 2019
 Succinea arundinetorum Heude, 1882
 Succinea aurita Hylton Scott, 1951
 Succinea aurulenta Ancey, 1889
 Succinea australis (Férussac, 1821)
 Succinea baconi L. Pfeiffer, 1855
 Succinea badia Morelet, 1867
 Succinea bakeri Hubricht, 1963
 † Succinea baoyueensis W. Yü & X.-Q. Zhang, 1982 
 Succinea barbadensis Guilding, 1828
 Succinea baumanni Sturany, 1894
 Succinea bequaerti Pilsbry, 1919
 Succinea bermudensis L. Pfeiffer, 1857
 Succinea bernardii Récluz, 1852
 † Succinea bertrandi Fontannes, 1884 
 Succinea bettii E. A. Smith, 1877
 Succinea bicolorata Ancey, 1889
 † Succinea boissyi Deshayes, 1863 
 Succinea brevis Dunker in Pfeiffer, 1850
 † Succinea brevispira Deshayes, 1863 
 Succinea burmeisteri Döring, 1873
 Succinea caduca Mighels, 1845
 Succinea californica P. Fischer and Crosse, 1878 – San Tomas ambersnail
 Succinea campestris Say, 1817 – Crinkled Ambersnail
 Succinea canella A. Gould, 1846
 Succinea carectorum Heude, 1882
 Succinea carmenensis P. Fischer & Crosse, 1878
 Succinea casta Ancey, 1899
 Succinea cepulla A. Gould, 1846
 Succinea ceylanica Pfeiffer, 1855
 Succinea chinensis L. Pfeiffer, 1857
 Succinea chudeaui Germain, 1907
 Succinea cinnamomea Ancey, 1889
 Succinea clarionensis Dall, 1926
 Succinea cochinchinensis Crosse & P. Fischer, 1863
 Succinea collina Hanley & Theobald, 1873
 Succinea colorata P. Fischer & Crosse, 1877
 Succinea comorensis Fischer-Piette & Vukadinovic, 1974
 Succinea concordialis A. Gould, 1848
 Succinea congoensis Pilsbry, 1919
 Succinea contenta (Iredale, 1939)
 Succinea contorta C. B. Adams, 1845
 Succinea cordovana P. Fischer & Crosse, 1877
 Succinea costaricana von Martens, 1898
 Succinea costulosa Pease, 1865
 Succinea crassinuclea L. Pfeiffer, 1849
 Succinea crocata A. Gould, 1846
 Succinea cryptica Tillier, 1981
 Succinea cygnorum Pilsbry, 1930
 Succinea dakaensis Sturany, 1898
 Succinea daucina L. Pfeiffer, 1854
 Succinea delicata Ancey, 1889
 Succinea dolphin C. M. Cooke & Clench, 1945
 Succinea dominicensis L. Pfeiffer, 1853
 † Succinea dongyingensis Youluo, 1978 
 Succinea donneti L. Pfeiffer, 1853
 Succinea elegantior Annandale, 1921
 Succinea elongata Pease, 1870
 Succinea erythrophana Ancey, 1883
 Succinea eussoensis Preston, 1912
 Succinea exarata F. Krauss, 1848
 Succinea falklandica E. A. Smith, 1884
 Succinea fischeri Gassies, 1871
 Succinea flexilis Quick, 1957
 Succinea floridana Pilsbry, 1905 – Florida chalksnail
 Succinea fulgens Lea, 1841 (taxon inquirendum)
 Succinea garrettiana Ancey, 1899
 Succinea gayana (d'Orbigny, 1835)
 Succinea gibba Henshaw, 1904
 Succinea girnarica Theobald, 1859
 Succinea gladiator Schileyko & Likharev, 1986
 Succinea globispira Martens, 1898
 Succinea godivariana Gude, 1914
 Succinea gracilis I. Lea, 1841
 Succinea grosvenorii I. Lea, 1864 – Santa Rita ambersnail
 Succinea guadelupensis Dall, 1900
 Succinea guatemalensis Morelet, 1849
 Succinea gundlachi Pfeiffer, 1852 (taxon inquirendum)
 Succinea gyrata J. S. Gibbons, 1879
 Succinea hanleyi Gude, 1914
 Succinea hararensis Connolly, 1928
 Succinea haustellum  Rehder, 1942
 † Succinea headonensis Wenz, 1919 
 † Succinea henanensis Y.-T. Li, 1983 
 Succinea hortulana Morelet, 1851
 Succinea humerosa A. Gould, 1846
 Succinea hyalina Shuttleworth, 1854
 † Succinea imperspicua S. V. Wood, 1851 
 Succinea indiana Pilsbry, 1905 – Xeric Ambersnail
 Succinea indica L. Pfeiffer, 1849
 Succinea infundibuliformis A. Gould, 1846
 Succinea interioris Tate, 1894
 Succinea kempi Preston, 1912
 Succinea konaensis Sykes, 1897
 Succinea kuntziana Solem, 1959
 Succinea labiosa Philippi, 1860
 Succinea latior C. B. Adams, 1849
 Succinea lauta A. Gould, 1859
 Succinea lauzannei Germain, 1909
 Succinea lebruni Mabille, 1884
 Succinea lessensis Pilsbry, 1919
 † Succinea lingulata X.-G. Zhu, 1985 
 Succinea listeri E. A. Smith, 1889
 Succinea lopesi Lanzieri, 1966
 Succinea lumbalis A. Gould, 1846
 Succinea luteola Gould, 1848 – Mexico ambersnail
 Succinea lutosa Pilsbry, 1926
 Succinea lutulenta Ancey, 1889
 Succinea macgillivrayi Cox, 1864
 Succinea macta Poey, 1858
 Succinea magellanica A. Gould, 1846
 Succinea magnaciana Heude, 1882
 Succinea manaosensis Pilsbry, 1926
 Succinea manuana A. Gould, 1846
 Succinea margarita L. Pfeiffer, 1853
 † Succinea marioni Saporta, 1889 
 Succinea martini (Jousseaume, 1887)
 Succinea masafuerae Odhner, 1922
 Succinea masoala Emberton & Griffiths, 2009
 Succinea mauiensis Ancey, 1889
 Succinea maxima Henshaw, 1904
 Succinea mcgregori Pilsbry, 1898
 Succinea meridionalis d'Orbigny, 1846
 Succinea mirabilis Henshaw, 1904
 Succinea modesta A. Gould, 1846
 Succinea monticula C. Semper, 1873
 Succinea montrouzieri Crosse, 1867
 † Succinea nagpurensis Hislop, 1860 
 Succinea newcombiana Garrett, 1857
 Succinea nobilis Poey, 1853
 Succinea norfolkensis Sykes, 1900
 Succinea normalis Ancey, 1881
 Succinea nyassana Dupuis & Putzeys, 1923
 Succinea obesa E. von Martens, 1867
 Succinea ochracina Gundlach in Poey, 1858
 Succinea ordinaria E. A. Smith, 1905
 Succinea oregonensis I. Lea, 1841 – Oregon ambersnail
 Succinea orientalis Benson, 1851
 † Succinea palliolum F. Sandberger, 1871 
 Succinea panamensis Pilsbry, 1920
 Succinea panucoensis Pilsbry, 1910
 Succinea paralia Hubricht, 1983 – Saltmarsh Ambersnail
 † Succinea parscovensis Cobălcescu, 1883 
 Succinea patagonica E. A. Smith, 1881
 Succinea peruviana L. Pfeiffer, 1867
 Succinea philippinica Möllendorff, 1893
 Succinea piratarum Quadras & Möllendorff, 1894
 Succinea princei Preston, 1912
 Succinea pristina Henshaw, 1904
 Succinea propinqua Drouët, 1859
 † Succinea protevoluta Yen, 1969 
 Succinea protracta Sykes, 1900
 Succinea pseudomalonyx Dupuis & Putzeys, 1902
 Succinea pudorina A. Gould, 1846
 Succinea pueblensis Crosse & P. Fischer, 1877
 Succinea puna Tomassi & Cuezzo, 2021
 Succinea punctata L. Pfeiffer, 1855
 Succinea putamen A. Gould, 1846
 Succinea putris (Linnaeus, 1758) – European ambersnail
 Succinea quadrasi Möllendorff, 1894
 Succinea quadrata Ancey, 1904
 Succinea quicki van Benthem Jutting, 1964
 Succinea raoi Rao & Mitra, 1976
 Succinea recisa Morelet, 1851 – rustic ambersnail
 Succinea riisei L. Pfeiffer, 1853
 † Succinea rollieri Maillard, 1892 
 Succinea rosariensis Döring, 1873
 Succinea rubella Pease, 1871
 Succinea rugosa L. Pfeiffer, 1842
 Succinea rugulosa Morelet, 1872
 Succinea rusticana Gould, 1846 – rustic ambersnail
 Succinea rutilans W. T. Blanford, 1870
 Succinea sagra d'Orbigny, 1842
 † Succinea schumacheri And.
 † Succinea scitula X.-G. Zhu, 1985 
 Succinea setchuanensis Heude, 1882
 † Succinea shenyangensis Youluo, 1978 
 Succinea simplex L. Pfeiffer, 1855
 Succinea simplicissima Preston, 1912
 Succinea snigdha Rao, 1924
 Succinea socorroensis Dall, 1926
 Succinea solastra Hubricht, 1961 – Lone Star ambersnail
 Succinea solidula L. Pfeiffer, 1849
 Succinea solitaria E. A. Smith, 1887
 † Succinea sparnacensis Deshayes, 1863 
 Succinea striata F. Krauss, 1848
 Succinea strigillata A. Adams & Angas, 1864
 Succinea strubelli Strubell, 1895
 Succinea subgranosa L. Pfeiffer, 1850
 † Succinea subpfeifferi Gottschick, 1920 †
 Succinea tenella Morelet, 1865
 Succinea tenerrima Ancey, 1904
 Succinea tenuis Gundlach in Poey, 1858
 Succinea teragona Ancey, 1904
 Succinea texta Odhner, 1922
 Succinea tornadri Rao, 1924
 † Succinea ubaghsi Bosquet, 1859 
 Succinea undulata Say, 1829
 Succinea unicolor Tryon, 1866 – squatty ambersnail
 Succinea urbana Hubricht, 1961 – urban ambersnail
 Succinea vaginacontorta C. B. Lee, 1951
 Succinea venusta A. Gould, 1846
 Succinea vesicalis A. Gould, 1846
 Succinea virgata E. von Martens, 1865
 Succinea vitrea L. Pfeiffer, 1855
 Succinea waianaensis Ancey, 1899
 Succinea wallisi C. M. Cooke & Clench, 1945
 Succinea wilsonii I. Lea, 1864 – golden ambersnail
 Succinea yarkandensis G. Nevill, 1881
 † Succinea zhuoxianensis W. Yü & H.-Z. Pan, 1982 

Additional species, taken from IUCN Red List:
 Succinea sanctaehelenae Lesson, 1830

Synonyms
 Succinea aurea Lea, 1841: synonym of Mediappendix vermeta (Say, 1829)
 Succinea barberi (W. B. Marshall, 1926) – Sanibel ambersnail: synonym of Oxyloma barberi (W. B. Marshall, 1926)
 Succinea chittenangoensis Pilsbry, 1908 – Chittenango ovate amber snail: synonym of Novisuccinea chittenangoensis (Pilsbry, 1908)
 Succinea depressa Rang, 1834: synonym of Pellicula depressa (Rang, 1834) (original combination)
 Succinea forsheyi I. Lea, 1864 – spotted ambersnail: synonym of Succinea concordialis A. Gould, 1848
 Succinea gabbi Tryon, 1866 – riblet ambersnail: synonym of Mediappendix gabbii (Tryon, 1866)
 Succinea greerii Tryon, 1866 – dryland ambersnail: synonym of Succinea grosvenorii I. Lea, 1864
 Succinea ovalis Say, 1817 is a synonym for Novisuccinea ovalis (Say, 1817)
 Succinea pennsylvanica Pilsbry, 1948 – Penn ambersnail: synonym of Novisuccinea pennsylvanica (Pilsbry, 1948)
 † Succinea peregrina F. Sandberger, 1872: synonym of †Oxyloma affine (Reuss in Reuss & Meyer, 1849) 
 Succinea pseudavara Webb, 1954: synonym of Succinea grosvenorii I. Lea, 1864
 Succinea strigata Pfeiffer, 1855 – striate ambersnail: synonym of Novisuccinea strigata (L. Pfeiffer, 1855)
 Succinea tomentosa L. Pfeiffer, 1855: synonym of Austropeplea tomentosa (L. Pfeiffer, 1855)

Ecology
Parasites of Succinea spp. include:
 Elaphostrongylus spp.
Succinea consume small plants such as mosses as well as leaf litter. Specifically Succinea campestris is known to live in leaf liter, and is also known to be attracted to light, an unusual characteristic in snail.  
In mating, the snails are hermaphrodites and mate reciprocally (both snails transfer sperm into one another), however many have preferences in what role they take - some actively seek out mates, mounting the others' shell, while others do not.

References

 Patterson C.M. (1989). Morphological studies of a Tahitian succineid, Succinea (Kondosuccinea) wallisi. Malacological Review. 22(1-2): 17-23.

External links
 Draparnaud, J.-P.-R. (1801). Tableau des mollusques terrestres et fluviatiles de la France. Montpellier / Paris (Renaud / Bossange, Masson & Besson). 1-116
 Solem, A. (1959). Systematics and zoogeography of the land and fresh-water Mollusca of the New Hebrides. Fieldiana Zoology. 4(3): 1-359.

 

Succineidae